Jérôme Fillol (born 10 February 1978, in Agen) is a French rugby player, who currently plays for Top 14 club Stade Français after signing from Racing Métro in 2011. His most famous involvement in rugby to date was on 6 April when he was accused of spitting at Peter Stringer during an Amlin Cup match with Bath. He was subsequently found guilty by a judiciary panel and banned for 14 weeks.

Honours
Stade Toulousain
Championnat de France (2001)
Stade Français
Top 16 (2003)
Top 14 (2007)
Racing Métro
Pro D2 (2009)

References

French rugby union players
Living people
1978 births
Rugby union scrum-halves
Racing 92 players
Stade Français players
Stade Toulousain players
USA Perpignan players
Sportspeople from Agen